The 1948 Gent–Wevelgem was the tenth edition of the Gent–Wevelgem cycle race and was held on 9 May 1948. The race started in Ghent and finished in Wevelgem. The race was won by Valère Ollivier.

General classification

References

Gent–Wevelgem
1948 in road cycling
1948 in Belgian sport
May 1948 sports events in Europe